Tomahawk Lagoon is a twin-lobed lagoon, located at the western end of the Otago Peninsula within the city limits of Dunedin, New Zealand. It lies close to the southeastern edge of the city's main urban area, near the suburb of Ocean Grove, which lies close to its southern shore. This suburb was also known as Tomahawk until the 1930s.

Name 

The name "Tomahawk", documented in the Otago Witness from 1852, is unlikely to be a reference to the weapon. It is more likely an anglicized form of the Māori words toma haka, often interpreted as "dance by a gravesite". Toma means a place of bones, or shrine for bones; haka is here taken to mean the Māori dance of challenge, but may rather be the Southern Māori form of the word hanga, to build or create. However, there are no known pre-European burial sites or reported finds of human bones in the area.

Physical geography 

The lagoon, which is connected by a short stream to the Pacific Ocean, is noted for its bird life. Despite its name, it is never inundated with the sea, but is more of a shallow coastal lake, predominantly under  in depth. The top lagoon (inner lobe) is a wildlife reserve. A smaller beach, Smaills Beach, lies further to the east, beyond which is the outcrop of Maori Head,  from the lagoon's mouth. A rocky reef and the small Bird Island lie close to the headland. To the west of the lagoon's mouth is the prominent headland of Lawyers Head, a major Dunedin landmark.

The Top Lagoon joins the Bottom Lagoon via a short stream in the middle of the latter's eastern shore.

Several small streams flow through the steep valleys which lie to the north and northeast. The largest of these is Lagoon Creek, which flows from near Arthur's Seat for some  before feeding the Top Lagoon at its northeastern end. Owing to the pastoral nature of much of the surrounding land, nutrient runoff into the lake is frequently high, resulting in its often eutrophic nature.

References

Geography of Dunedin
Otago Peninsula
Lagoons of New Zealand
Landforms of Otago
Wetlands of Otago